The first record in the 100 metres for men (athletics) was recognised by the International Amateur Athletics Federation, now known as World Athletics, in 1912.

, the IAAF had ratified 67 records in the event, not including rescinded records.

Unofficial progression before the IAAF

IAAF record progression

"Wind" in these tables refers to wind assistance, the velocity of the wind parallel to the runner - positive values are from the starting line towards the finish line, negative are from the finish line towards the starting line, 0 is no wind in either direction, and all values are measured in metres per second.  Any wind perpendicular to the runners (from left to right, right to left, or up to down or down to up, although the conditions of the track generally preclude those wind directions) is ignored and not listed.

"Auto" refers to automatic timing, and for the purposes of these lists, indicates auto times which were either also taken for hand-timed records, or were rounded to the tenth or hundredth of a second (depending on the rounding rules then in effect) for the official record time.

Records 1912–1976

The first manual time of 9.9 seconds was recorded for Bob Hayes in the final of the 100 metres at the 1964 Olympics. Hayes' official time of 10.0 seconds was determined by rounding down the electronic time of 10.06 to the nearest tenth of a second, giving the appearance of a manual time. This method was unique to the Olympics of 1964 and 1968, and the officials at the track recorded Hayes' time as 9.9 seconds.

Records since 1977
Since 1975, the IAAF has accepted separate automatically electronically timed records for events up to 400 metres. Starting on January 1, 1977, the IAAF has required fully automatic timing to the hundredth of a second for these events.

Jim Hines' October 1968 Olympic gold medal run was the fastest recorded fully electronic 100 metre race up to that date, at 9.95 seconds. Track and Field News has compiled an unofficial list of automatically timed records starting with the 1964 Olympics and Bob Hayes' gold medal performance there. Those marks are included in the progression.

Low-altitude record progression 1968–1987

The IAAF considers marks set at high altitude as acceptable for record consideration. However, high altitude can significantly assist sprint performances. One estimate suggests times in the 200 m sprint can be assisted by between 0.09 s and 0.14 s with the maximum allowable tailing wind of (2.0 m/s), and gain 0.3 s at altitudes over 2000 m. For this reason, unofficial low-altitude record lists have been compiled.

After the IAAF started to recognise only electronic times in 1977, the then-current record and subsequent record were both set at altitude. It was not until 1987 that the world record was equalled or surpassed by a low-altitude performance. The following progression of low-altitude records therefore starts with Hines's low-altitude "record" when the IAAF started to recognise only electronic timing in 1977, and continues to Lewis's low-altitude performance that equalled the high-altitude world record in 1987. (Ben Johnson's 9.95 run in 1986 and 9.83 run in 1987 are omitted.)

See also
 Women's 100 metres world record progression
 Men's 200 metres world record progression
 100-yard dash

Notes

References

100
100 metres

de:100-Meter-Lauf#Weltrekordentwicklung